The following is a list of episodes for The Rosie Show.

Episodes

2011

2012

References

External links
 

Rosie Show